Connecticut is home to 15 species of snakes and only two are venomous. The Black racer (Coluber c. constrictor), Dekay's brownsnake (Storeria d. dekayi), Eastern ratsnake (Pantherophis obsoletus), Garternake (Thamnophis s. sirtalis), Hog-nosed snake (Heterodon platirhinos), milk snake (Lampropeltis t. triangulum), northern watersnake (Nerodia sipedon sipedon), redbelly snake (Storeria o. occipitomaculata), ribbonsnake (Thamnophis sauritus), ring-necked snake (Diadophis punctatus edwardsii), smooth greensnake (Liochlorophis vernalis) and worm snake (Carphophis a. amoenus)) are non-venomous. The non-venomous Brahminy blind snake (Indotyphlops braminus) was introduced from Southeast Asia and has established a viable population in Connecticut. The Copperhead (Agkistrodon contortrix mokasen) and Timber rattlesnake (Crotalus horridus) are venomous. In the state of the Connecticut, the Timber rattlesnake is listed as endangered and Eastern ratsnake is regulated with both the Ribbonsnake and Hog-nosed snake as of special concern.

Snakes

References 

Snakes
Conn